The serials crisis is a term that describes the problem of rising subscription costs of serial publications, especially scholarly journals, outpacing academic institutions’ library budgets and limiting their ability to meet researchers’ needs.  The prices of these institutional or library subscriptions have been rising much faster than the Consumer Price Index for several decades, while the funds available to the libraries have remained static or have declined in real terms. As a result, academic and research libraries have regularly canceled serial subscriptions to accommodate price increases of the remaining current subscriptions. Increased prices have also led to the increased popularity in shadow libraries.

Causes
The subscription prices of scholarly journals have been increasing at a rate faster than the inflation rate for several decades. This chronic inflation is caused by several factors, discussed below.

Price inelasticity
Each journal title publishes unique research findings and as a result is a unique commodity that cannot be replaced in an academic library collection by another journal title, such as a less expensive journal on the same subject, as one could with commodities. The publisher thus has the ability to act as a monopolist. Scholarly journals vary greatly in quality as do the individual articles that they publish. The highest quality journals are often expected and demanded by scholars to be included in their institution's library collections, often with little regard or knowledge about the subscription costs. Traditional metrics for quality in scholarly journals include Impact Factor and Citation count as recorded by Journal Citation Reports.  This leads to price inelasticity for these higher quality journals.

Publishers 

Another possible set of factors in this situation includes the increasing domination of scholarly communication by a small number of commercial publishers, whose journals are far more costly than those of most academic societies. However, the institutional subscription prices for journals published by some academic society publishers (see below) have also exhibited inflationary patterns similar to those seen among commercial publishers.

The earnings of the American Chemical Society (ACS), for example, is based, in large parts, on publications. In 1999, the income of the ACS was $349 million, where $250 million came from information services. According to a 2004 House of Commons report (by the Science and Technology Committee), the ACS is one of the driving forces of the STM (science, technology, medicine) serials crisis. According to the same report, the crisis started around 1990, when many universities and libraries complained about the dramatic inflation of STM subscription prices especially for the flagship JACS, which is exclusively sold as a bundle with all other ACS journals. The report further complains that

Every year the Library Journal publishes a summary of periodical pricing and inflation. "The rate of price increase is analyzed for more than 18,000 e-journal packages handled by EBSCO Information Services...For 2019, the average rate of increase over two years was 5.5%, up slightly from 5% in 2018."

Growth in scholarly publishing 
An additional problem is a dramatic increase in the volume of research literature and increasing specialization of that research, i.e. the creation of academic subfields.
This includes a growth in the number of scholars and an increase in potential demand for these journals.
At the same time, funds available to purchase journals are often decreasing in real terms. Libraries have seen their collection budgets decline in real terms compared to the United States Periodical Price Index. As a result of the increasing cost of journals, academic libraries have reduced their expenditures on other types of publications such as scholarly monographs.

Exchange rates 
Currency exchange rates can serve to increase the volatility of subscription prices throughout the world. For example, journal publishers in Europe often set their prices in euro, not United States dollars, so subscribers in the United States will experience varying prices due to exchange rate fluctuations. The converse is true for European institutions who subscribe to journals published in the United States. As the United States and Europe publish the vast majority of scholarly journals, libraries in other regions are subject to ever greater uncertainty. Although exchange rates can go down as well as up, long-term trends in currency values can lead to chronic price inflation experienced by particular libraries or collections.

Solutions, alternatives and developments 
There is much discussion among case librarians and scholars about the crisis and how to address its consequences. Academic and research libraries are resorting to several tactics to contain costs, while maintaining access to the latest scholarly research for their users. These tactics include: increasingly borrowing journals from one another (see interlibrary loan) or purchasing single articles from commercial document suppliers instead of subscribing to whole journals. Additionally, academic and research libraries cancel subscriptions to the least used or least cost-effective journals. Another tactic has been converting from printed to electronic copies of journals; however, publishers sometimes charge more for the online edition of a journal, and price increases for online journals have followed the same inflationary pattern as have journals in paper format. Many individual libraries have joined co-operative consortia that negotiate license terms for journal subscriptions on behalf of their member institutions. Another tactic has been to encourage various methods of obtaining free access to journals, of which black open access provided by Sci-Hub became the most successful.

Unbundling big deals 
A subscription to a bundle of several journals, at a discounted price, is known as a "big deal". In a big deal, a library or consortium of libraries typically pays several million dollars per year to subscribe to hundreds or thousands of toll access journals. By offering such discounted bundled subscriptions, the largest journal publishers were able to squeeze out of the market smaller (often, non-profit and less expensive) publishers, who did not have many journal titles and could not offer a discounted bundle subscription.

In the 2010s, efforts increased to "unwrap" or "unbundle" the subscription, if not to cancel them altogether. Services emerged for libraries to share information and reduce the information asymmetry in negotiations with the publishers, like the SPARC cancellation tracking and the Unsub data analysis tool.

Open access 
Developed in part as a response to the serials crisis, open access models have included new models of financing scholarly journals that may serve to reduce the monopoly power of scholarly journal publishers which is considered a contributing factor to the creation of the serials crisis. These include open access journals and open access repositories.

See also
 Academic journal publishing reform
 List of public domain resources behind a paywall
 Library and information science
 Elsevier § Criticism and controversies
 The Cost of Knowledge
 United States v. Swartz

References

Further reading

 
 
 
 
 
 
 
 
 
 Crisis in Scholarly Publishing: Executive Summary, by Stephen Boyd and Andrew Herkovic (1999)
 Understanding the Economic Burden of Scholarly Publishing, by Cathy N. Davidson (2003)
 A Failure in Communications, The metamorphosis of academic publishing by Brian Evans (2006)
 The Crisis in Scientific Publishing (University of Maryland, frequently updated.)

External links
 .

Publishing
Library science
Academia
Serials (publishing)